Jamāl ad-Dīn al-Ḥasan bin Yūsuf bin ʿAli bin al-Muṭahhar al-Ḥillī (December 1250 – December 1325 CE), commonly known as Allāma Ḥelli, was a Twelver Shia theologian and mujtahid. He was one of the well known Shia scholars of his time. His full name is Jamāl ad-Dīn Abu Manṣūr al-Ḥasan bin Yūsuf ibn al-Muṭahhar al-Ḥillī. We know of at least one hundred books written by him, some of which are still in the form of manuscripts. Muhammad bin Al-Hassan al Hurr Al- Amili in his work Amal al Amil, p. 40, enumerated no less than 67 works of this learned author.

Names and titles
Al-Ḥilli's name is as follows: His kunya was Abu Manṣūr and his first title was ʿAllāma “sage,” his second, Jamāl al-Dīn, and third, Jamāl al-Milla wa l-Ḥaqq wa l-Dīn. His given name was al-Ḥasan and his father's given name was Yūsuf.

Life
Al-Hilli also known as the sage of Hilla, was born in the still existent town of Al Hillah, Iraq. commonly viewed as the centre of Shia Islam when Sunni leaders were in control over Baghdad during his life. He entered into a prominent family of Shia jurists and theologians. His father, Sadid ul-Din al-Hilli, was a respected mujtahid and a leading figure in the Shia community. His maternal uncle Muhaqqiq al-Hilli was also a renowned scholar.

He studied theology and fiqh (Islamic jurisprudence) in Hilla under the auspices of his father and his uncle, as well as other notable scholars, including: Ali bin Tawus and Ahmad bin Tawus. He also spent some time at the newly established Maragheh observatory, where he studied Avicennan philosophy and mathematics under Nasir al-Din al-Tusi, and was also introduced to the works of Fakhr al-Din al-Razi. Later, he travelled to Baghdad and became acquainted with the doctrines of Ibn Arabi.

Among his other  teachers were Najm al-Dīn al-Qazwīnī al-Kātibī  and Maitham Al Bahrani. He also sat with the Sunni scholars to study Sunni Fiqh. Like Al Bahrani and Nasir, 'Allamah-i Hilli was contemporary with the Mongol upheaval, and played a role similar to that of his teacher.

Allamah-i Hilli was a prolific writer whose bibliography comprises about one hundred and twenty titles. Some of his works have been published, while the manuscripts of others have still to be found.

After mastering philosophy, theology and astrology as a pupil of the eminent scholars of his time, he began a prolific career as an authoritative writer in his own right. Some 500 works are attributed to him, although only a few have been published so far. He moved to Persia in 705/1305, where he became most influential in spreading Shia Islam within Il-Khanid court circles.

In 1305, Al-Hilli emigrated to Persia, to the court of the Ilkhan ruler Öljaitü, whom it is believed he converted from Sunni to Shia Islam. As a result of his conversion, Öljaitü proclaimed Shia Islam as the state religion in Persia. Coins were minted in the names of The Twelve Imams. Both al-Hilli and his son, Fakhr ul-Muhaqqiqin were engaged in extensive theological and jurisprudential debates with the local Sunni scholars. Having impressed the Ilkhan, he was appointed to the traveling madrassah sayyarah. Al-Hilli, however, eventually returned to his hometown and spent the last years of his life teaching there.

Intellectual output
According to some sources, Al-Hilli wrote more than a thousand works (including short treatises and epistles) on Islamic law, jurisprudence, theology and Qur'anic commentary. Of these, about sixty are still extant. Yet, only eight of these are published. They are “regarded by the Imami Shi'ia as the most authentic expositions of their dogma and practice”. The popularity and influence of his writings on later scholars are demonstrated by the large number of manuscripts and great number of commentaries written on them. He himself is the best source of information on his own works as he has recorded all of his writings up to the year 1294 in his biographical work Khulasat ul-Aqwal (The Summary of Opinions).

Theology
In theology, Al-Hilli was clearly acquainted with the Basran school of Mu'tazilism, as his earliest writing on theology Manhaj ul-Yaqin fi Usul il-Din, demonstrates. He was also deeply influenced by Nasir al-Din al-Tusi, and wrote a commentary on the latter's famous Tajrid ul-I'tiqad. This commentary is one of al-Hilli's most widely read works, being the first commentary written on the Tajrid and thus forming the basis of later commentators understanding of Tusi's work. Also due to his work in Tajrid ul-I'tiqad, Al-Hilli has been noted as one of the first Shia Imamiyyah scholars to use the term, ijtihad (i’tiqad) in the sense of “putting in of the utmost effort in acquiring the knowledge of the laws of the Shariah”. From this point Shia accepted this term.

Another of his most famous theological works is The Eleventh Chapter (Al-Bab al-Hadi 'Ashar - the title is an allusion to an earlier work of his, Manhaj ul-Salat, which was composed of ten chapters), which he composed towards the end of his life as a concise summary of Shia doctrines for the learned lay person (rather than aspiring scholars). Judging by the number of commentaries written on it, and its translation into Persian and English, it represents his most popular work.

He wrote several polemical treatises during his time at the court of the Ilkhan. These were largely directed against Sunni, Ash'arite theology. In them, he was largely concerned with espousing and defending the Shia view of the Imamate and Mutazilite notions of free will (as opposed to Asharite determinism). He was also acquainted with Avicennan and Ishraqi philosophy. He wrote several works of his own, dealing with subjects such as logic, physics, metaphysics and mathematics. In general he is very critical of the opinions held by Islamic philosophers and sets out to rebut them whenever they appear to disagree with mainstream theology. According to the Encyclopaedia of Islam, “his services were so much appreciated by the Shi'is that soon after his death his grave in Mashhad became one of the centres of veneration for those who go on pilgrimage to the tomb of Imam 'Ali-al-Rida”.

Jurisprudence
Al-Hilli's role in shaping Twelver jurisprudence is of great importance. As well as several works and commentaries on usul al-fiqh, he produced a voluminous legal corpus. Of this, two of the most important works are al-Mukhtalaf (The Disagreement) and al-Muntaha (The End). Mukhtalaf is a legal manual devoted to addressing legal questions in which the Shia jurists hold differing opinions, whereas the Muntaha is a systematic and detailed exposition of al-Hilli's own legal opinions. He also wrote a summarized legal manual, Qawa'id ul-Ahkam, which was popular amongst later scholars, judging by the number of commentaries that would be written on it. Amongst his later legal works is Tadhkirat ul-Fuqaha, which is a legal manual intended for use by lay persons. He also composed legal works on specific issues (for example, Hajj or Salat).

Al-Ḥillī's contribution to jurisprudence, Mabādiʾ al-wuṣūl ilā ʿilm al-uṣūl, was translated in a dual Arabic-English edition asThe Foundations of Jurisprudence: An Introduction to Imāmī Shīʿī Legal Theory by Sayyid Amjad H. Shah Naqavi, Dean of the Shīʿah Institute, and published by the Shīʿah Institute Press's Classical Shīah Library imprint in collaboration with Brill in 2016. According to Naqavi, al-Ḥillī's "Mabādiʾ is a veritable summa of jurisprudence that offers a concise, and highly condensed, overview of the entire subject of jurisprudence (uṣūl al-fiqh), as well as a vista from which to fully survey the state of jurisprudential theory in both the era of the author and in that leading up to it." In his introduction, Naqavi states that the first chapter of the Mabādiʾ concerns the philosophy of language, including discussions regarding "the nature of the relationship between meaning (or sense) and reference, that is, how the semantic properties of an utterance relate to its syntactic properties, the relationship between meaning and use, the question of wheth- er or not connotation outstrips denotation, as well as an extended inquiry into, and theorisation upon, the proposed origins of language." Language is key to al-Ḥillī's jurisprudential thinking because, as Naqavi says, "all subsequent discussions in the Mabādiʾ depend on how the revealed word of the Qurʾān, as well as the recorded Prophetic and Imāmic utterances, are to be practically interpreted and understood for the purposes of jurisprudential theory—an inquiry which is as much to do with language, as it is with theology".

The second chapter in Foundations of Jurisprudence concerns al-Ḥillī's examination of rulings (al-aḥkām), and includes discussions of 'the ethical evaluation and analyses of an action, the correspondent rulings that will therefore be applied to it, the conditions according to which the ruling for an action can be qualified by its manner of performance, and other related matters, with a view to articulating how these in turn inform the status of an action’s ruling'.

As Naqavi notes, the third chapter in the Mabādiʾ, entitled 'On the Commands (al-awāmir) and Prohibitions (al-nawāhī)', begins 'with a linguistic inquiry into which utterances constitute a command; viz. a discussion of the differences of opinion regarding the quiddity of speech and the imperative form of the verb. ʿAllāmah then offers an intensely detailed mapping and typology of the different kinds of obligation which utterances can produce, and brings to the fore the specificities of different commands and their various modalities.'

The Mabādiʾ contains further chapters on: Commands (al-awāmir) and Prohibitions (al-nawāhī), Generality (al-ʿumūm) and Specificity (al- khuṣūṣ), Ambiguous (al-mujmal) and the Elucidated (al-mubayyan), Actions (al-afʿāl), Abrogation (al-naskh), Consensus (al-ijmāʿ), Narrations (al-akhbār), Analogical Reasoning (al-qiyās), Preferment (al-tarjīḥ), and Juristic Reasoning (al-ijtihād) and its Dependents. 

For Naqavi, al-Ḥillī's 'contribution to the development of Imāmī legal theory and the distinctive stance he takes upon certain jurisprudential matters [...] can be summarised in the following manner', namely that 'ʿAllāmah upholds: the principle of indifferency (al-ibāḥah) regarding the state of all things prior to the revelation of divine law (al-sharʿ); that some utterances are legally veritative (al-ḥaqīqah al-sharʿiyyah); that the command (al-amr) neither signifies a one-off (al-marrah) nor a repeat performance (al-takrār); that with respect to social interactions the prohibition (al-nahy) does not demand the unsoundness (al-fasād) of the thing which is prohibited; that the utterances of generality (alfāẓ al-ʿumūm) are assigned for the arrival at a general meaning (al-maʿnā al-ʿāmm); that it is permissible to act in accordance (taʿabbud) with the solitary narration on the basis of intellection (ʿaql) and the divine law (sharʿ); and that the term juristic reasoning (al-ijtihād) ought to be understood according to the new nomenclature (iṣṭilāḥ) first employed by his uncle al-Muḥaqqiq al-Ḥillī: as an utmost scientific endeavour undertaken in order to infer a legal ruling (al-ḥukm al-sharʿī) from the evidence.'

Works 
One of his works on the concept of the Shia Imamate (Minhaj al-karamah) was criticized by the Sunni scholar Ibn Taymiyyah in his nine volume work Minhaaj As-Sunnah An-Nabawiyyah. Besides various treatises on religious law, 'Allamah established a systematic version of the science of tradition (hadith and akhbar), based on principles which were later to antagonise the usuliyun and the akhbariyun. In the kalam tradition, he left a commentary on one of the first treatises to be written by one of the oldest Imamite mutakallimun, Abu Ishaq Ibrahim al Nawbakhti, who died about 350/961. Similarly, he wrote commentaries on the two treatises by Nasir mentioned above, Tajrid and Qawa'id-commentaries which have been read and re-read, studied and commentated by generations of scholars. He left a summary of the vast commentary by his teacher Maytham al-Bahrani on the Nahj al-Balagha. Using the methods both of a man of the kalam and of a philosopher, he wrote studies on Avicenna's Al-Isharat wa-‘l-tanbihat (Remarks and Admonitions) and Kitab Al-Shifaʾ (The Book of Healing); attempted to solve the difficulties (hill al-mushkilat) of al-Suhrawardi's Kitab al-talwihat (Book of Elucidations); wrote a treatise comparing (tanasub) the Ash'arites and the Sophists; two other encyclopaedic treatises, The Hidden Secrets (al-Asar al-khaffyah) in philosophical sciences, the autographed version of which is at Najaf, and a Complete Course of Instruction (Ta'lim tamm) on philosophy and the kalam, etc. He casts doubt on the principle Ex Uno non fit nisi Unum (only One can proceed from the One), as his teacher Nasir Tusi, inspired by al-Suhrawardi, had done before him, and he concedes the existence of an intra-substantial motion which heralds the theory of Mulla Sadra.

Works 

His most notable works are the following:

 Kashf al-Yaqin fi Faḍā'il Amīr al-Mu'minīn , a short treatise on the excellence of Ali ('Alī Ibn Abī Ṭālib').
 Kihalastah al-Nisab, a treatise on the descendants of Ali, Alawi. This treatise also includes the descendants of Ali who migrated to other countries after the rise of Umayyad Caliphate.
 Minhāj al-Salat fi kktisar al-Misbah, a work on religious duties especially prayer.
 Minhaj al-karamah, a vindication of the Shia doctrine on Imamate.
 Manāhij al-yaqīn fi uṣūl al-dīn, a treatise on the fundamental principles of the Shia creed.
 Ma'ārij al-Fahm, a commentary by the author on his own work Nazm al Barahin.
 Nahj Al Haq Va Kashf Al Sedq, a refutation of the theology and legal system of the Sunnis.
 Naẓm al Barāhīn fi Uṣūl al-Dīn, a work on scholastic theology.
 Tadhkirat al-Fuqahā, a work on Shia jurisprudence in three volumes.
 Tahḏhīb al-wuṣūl ilā ʿilm al-uṣūl.
 Qawāʾid al-Aḥkām
 “Muḵḫtalaf al-Shīʾa fī Aḥkām al-Sharīʾa,” a work describing points of legal disagreement among the jurists.

Professors 
 Sadīd al-Dīn, Yūsuf bin ʿAli bin al-Muṭahhar al-Ḥillī (father).
 al-Muḥaqqiq al-Ḥillī.
Raḍhī al-Dīn, ʿAli bin Mūsa bin Ṭawwūs al-Ḥussainī.
 Jamāl al-Dīn, Aḥmad bin Mūsa bin Ṭawwūs al-Ḥussainī.
 Naṣīr al-Dīn al-Ṭūsī.
 Yaḥyā bin Saʾīd al-Ḥillī.
 Mufīd al-Dīn, Muḥammad bin Juhaym al-Assadī al-Ḥillī.
 Jamāl al-Dīn, al-Ḥussain bin Abān al-Naḥwī.
 Muḥammad bin Muḥammad bin Aḥmad al-Kayshī.
 Najm al-Dīn, ʿAli bin Omar al-Kātibī.
 Burhān al-Dīn al-Nasafī.
 ʿIzz al-Dīn al-Fārūqī al-Wāsiṭī.
 Taqī al-Dīn, Abdullāh bin Jaʾfar al-Ṣabbāgh al-Ḥanafī al-Kūfī.

References

Sources
Hilli, al-. (2006). Encyclopædia Britannica. Retrieved March 21, 2006, from Encyclopædia Britannica Premium Service  
Tehrani, Aga Buzurg. (date unknown). Tabaqat 'Alam il-Shi'ah. Tehran: Ismailian Publishers. (Arabic
Schmidkte, S. ḤELLI, ḤASAN B. YUSOF B. MOṬAHHAR. Encyclopædia Iranica (www.iranicaonline.org, accessed: 28.09.09)

1250 births
1325 deaths
People from Hillah
Iraqi Shia Muslims
13th-century Muslim scholars of Islam
14th-century Muslim scholars of Islam
Iranian Shia scholars of Islam
Legal scholars
Burials at Imam Ali Mosque
13th-century Arabs